Season two of Odin v odin! premiered on March 4, 2014.

Celebrities

Imitations chart

  Highest scoring performance
  Lowest scoring performance
  Qualified for the final
  Didn't qualify for the final

The following chart contains the names of the iconic singers that the celebrities imitated every week.

Top 3 Best results

 Highest scoring performance

Notes

One to One!
2014 Russian television seasons